W. "Barry" Davies was a Welsh international rugby union forward who played club rugby for Cardiff and international rugby for Wales, playing in one match, against Scotland in 1896.

Rugby career
Little is recorded of Davies, though it is known that he began his rugby career with Barry RFC, his hometown club and the origin of his nickname. Davies then switched to Cardiff Star, a small club team in Cardiff, notable for producing talent such as Gwyn Nicholls. Like Nicholls, Davies was noticed by major Welsh club Cardiff RFC joining them before the turn of the century.

In 1896 Davies was selected to represent the Wales national rugby team for the Home Nations Championship. Played at the Cardiff Arms Park against Scotland, the team, and the pack in particular saw a massive overhaul after a humiliating loss to England three weeks earlier. Davies was one of five new players brought into the eight man pack, and was joined by two Cardiff team mates in the backs, Nicholls and Selwyn Biggs. Despite being part of the winning team, Wales beating Scotland 6-0, Davies was replaced for the last game of the tournament by Fred Miller.

International matches played
Wales
  1896

Bibliography

References

Cardiff RFC players
Rugby union forwards
Rugby union players from Barry
Wales international rugby union players
Welsh rugby union players
1875 births
Year of death missing